A violin concerto is a concerto for solo violin (occasionally, two or more violins) and instrumental ensemble (customarily orchestra). Such works have been written since the Baroque period, when the solo concerto form was first developed, up through the present day. Many major composers have contributed to the violin concerto repertoire, with the best known works including those by Bach, Bartók, Beethoven, Brahms, Bruch, Dvořák, Khachaturian, Mendelssohn, Mozart, Paganini, Prokofiev, Sarasate, Shostakovich, Sibelius, Tchaikovsky, and Vivaldi.

Traditionally a three-movement work, the violin concerto has been structured in four movements by a number of modern composers, including Dmitri Shostakovich, Igor Stravinsky, and Alban Berg. In some violin concertos, especially from the Baroque and modern eras, the violin (or group of violins) is accompanied by a chamber ensemble rather than an orchestra—for instance, in Vivaldi's L'estro armonico, originally scored for four violins, two violas, cello, and continuo, and in Allan Pettersson's first concerto, for violin and string quartet.

List of violin concertos

The following concertos are presently found near the center of the mainstream Western repertoire.

John Adams
Violin Concerto (1993)
Malcolm Arnold
Concerto for Two Violins and String Orchestra (1969)
Johann Sebastian Bach
Violin Concerto in A minor, BWV 1041 (1717–1723)
Violin Concerto in E major, BWV 1042 (1717–1723)
Double Violin Concerto in D minor, BWV 1043 (1723)
Samuel Barber
Violin Concerto, Op. 14 (1939)
Béla Bartók
Violin Concerto No. 1 (1908)
Violin Concerto No. 2 (1938)
Ludwig van Beethoven
Violin Concerto in D major, Op. 61 (1806)
Alban Berg
Violin Concerto (1935)
Ernest Bloch
Violin Concerto (1938)
Nimrod Borenstein
Concerto for violin and orchestra opus 60 (2013)
Johannes Brahms 
Violin Concerto in D major, Op. 77 (1878)
Benjamin Britten
Violin Concerto (1939)
Max Bruch
Violin Concerto No. 1 in G minor, Op. 26 (1867)
Violin Concerto No. 2 in D minor, Op. 44 (1878)
Violin Concerto No. 3 in D minor, Op. 58 (1891)
Frederick Delius
 Violin Concerto
Henri Dutilleux
L'Arbre des songes (1985)
Antonín Dvořák
Violin Concerto in A minor, Op. 53 (1879–1880)
Danny Elfman
Concerto for Violin and Orchestra "Eleven Eleven" (2017)
Edward Elgar
Violin Concerto in B minor, Op. 61 (1910)
Eduard Franck
Violin Concerto in E minor, Op. 30 (1855/1861)
Violin Concerto in D major, Op. 57 (1875)
Richard Franck
Violin Concerto in D major, Op. 43 (1906)
Hans Gal
Violin Concerto Op. 39 (1932)
Concertino for Violin and Orchestra Op. 52 (1939)
Philip Glass
Concerto for Violin and Orchestra, No. 1 (1987)
Concerto for Violin and Orchestra, No. 2, "The American Four Seasons" (2009)
Alexander Glazunov
Violin Concerto in A minor, Op. 82 (1904)
Karl Goldmark
Violin Concerto No. 1 in A minor, Op. 28 (1877)
Georg Friedrich Händel
Violin Concerto in B flat major, HWV 288 (c. 1707)
Joseph Haydn
Violin Concerto No. 1 in C major, Hob. VIIa:1 (ca. 1765)
Violin Concerto No. 2 in D major, Hob. VIIa:2 (1765, lost)
Violin Concerto No. 3 in A major, Hob. VIIa:3 "Melker Konzert" (ca. 1770)
Violin Concerto No. 4 in G major, Hob. VIIa:4 (1769)
Jennifer Higdon
Violin Concerto (2008)
Paul Hindemith
Violin Concerto (1939) 
Robin Holloway
Violin Concerto Op. 70 (1990)
Akira Ifukube
Rhapsodia Concertante for Violin and Orchestra (1948)
Violin Concerto No. 2 (1978)
Shin'ichiro Ikebe
Violin Concerto, (1981)
Joseph Joachim
Violin Concerto No. 2 in D minor
Mieczysław Karłowicz
Violin Concerto in A major, Op. 8 (1902) 
Aram Khachaturian
Violin Concerto in D minor, Op. 46 (1940)
Ståle Kleiberg
Violin Concerto no. 1 (2005)
Violin Concerto no. 2 (2017)
Erich Wolfgang Korngold
Violin Concerto in D major, Op. 35 (1945)
Édouard Lalo
Violin Concerto in F major, Op. 20 (1874)
Symphonie Espagnole (1874)
Lowell Liebermann
Concerto for Violin and Orchestra Op. 74 (2001)
Avrohom Leichtling
Concerto for Violin and Orchestra Op. 95 (1988–1991)
György Ligeti
Violin Concerto (1992)
Karol Lipiński
Violin Concerto No. 1 Op. 14 in F  minor (1822)
Violin Concerto No. 2 "Militaire" Op. 21 in D major (1826)
Violin Concerto No. 3 Op. 24 in E minor (1830–33)
Violin Concerto No. 4 Op. 32 in A major (1844)
Wynton Marsalis
Violin Concerto (2019)
Henri Marteau
Violin Concerto in C Major, Op. 18 (1916)
Bohuslav Martinů
Violin Concerto No 1 H 232b (1933)
Violin Concerto No. 2 H 293 (1943)
Felix Mendelssohn
Violin Concerto in D minor (1822)
Violin Concerto in E minor, Op. 64 (1844)
Edgar Meyer
Violin Concerto (2000)
Nikolai Myaskovsky
Violin Concerto in D Minor, Op. 44 (1938)
Wolfgang Amadeus Mozart
Violin Concerto No. 1 in B major, K. 207 (1773), with alternative Rondo in B, K. 269/261a (added 1775–1777)
Violin Concerto No. 2 in D major, K. 211 (1775)
Violin Concerto No. 3 in G major, K. 216, Strassburg (1775)
Violin Concerto No. 4 in D major, K. 218 (1775)
Violin Concerto No. 5 in A major, K. 219, Turkish (1775), with alternative Adagio in E, K. 261 (added 1776)
Violin Concerto No. 6 in E-flat major, K. 268 (Attributed to Johann Friedrich Eck, 1780–81)
Violin Concerto No. 7 in D major, K. 271a, Kolb (Doubtful, 1777)
Adélaïde Concerto (Forgery by Marius Casadesus, 1933)
Marjan Mozetich
Affairs of the Heart: Violin Concerto (1998)
Carl Nielsen
Violin Concerto, Op. 33 (1911)
Michael Nyman
Violin Concerto (2003)
Niccolò Paganini
Violin Concerto No. 1 in D major, Op. 6, MS 21 (ca. 1811–17)
Violin Concerto No. 2 in B minor, Op. 7, MS 48, La Campanella (1826)
Violin Concerto No. 3 in E major, MS 50 (ca. 1826–30)
Violin Concerto No. 4 in D minor, MS 60 (ca. 1829–30)
Violin Concerto No. 5 in A minor, MS 78 (1830)
Violin Concerto No. 6 in E minor, Op. posth., MS 75—probably the first to be written; only the solo part survives
Giovanni Battista Pergolesi
Violin Concerto in B flat major
Manuel M. Ponce
Violin Concerto (1943)
Gerhard Präsent
Violin Concerto Op. 73 (2015)
André Previn
Violin Concerto "Anne-Sophie" (2001)
Sergei Prokofiev
Violin Concerto No. 1 in D major, Op. 19 (1917)
Violin Concerto No. 2 in G minor, Op. 63 (1935)
Behzad Ranjbaran
Violin Concerto (2002)
 Max Reger
Violin Concerto in A major Op. 101 (1907–1908)
Miklós Rózsa
Violin Concerto, Op. 24 (1953)
Camille Saint-Saëns
Violin Concerto No. 1 in A major, Op. 20 (1859)
Violin Concerto No. 2 in C major, Op. 58 (1858)
Violin Concerto No. 3 in B minor, Op. 61 (1880)
Esa-Pekka Salonen
Violin Concerto (2009)
Alfred Schnittke
Concerto No. 1 for violin and orchestra (1957, revised 1963)
Concerto No. 2 for violin and chamber orchestra (1966)
Concerto No. 3 for violin and chamber orchestra (1978)
Concerto No. 4 for violin and orchestra (1984)
Arnold Schoenberg
Violin Concerto (1936)
Robert Schumann
Violin Concerto, WoO 23 (1853)
Laura Schwendinger
Violin Concerto "Chiaroscuro Azzurro" 
Vache Sharafyan 
Concerto-Serenata for violin and strings
Con-Cor-Dance Violin Concerto #2
Dmitri Shostakovich
Violin Concerto No. 1 in A minor, Op. 77 (1948, rev. 1955 as Op. 99)
Violin Concerto No. 2 in C minor, Op. 129 (1967)
Aleksandr Shymko
Violin Concerto (2012)
Peter Seabourne
Violin Concerto (with string orchestra) (2018)
Jean Sibelius
Violin Concerto in D minor, Op. 47 (1904)
Maddalena Laura Sirmen
Six Violin Concerti
Igor Stravinsky
Violin Concerto (1931)
Karol Szymanowski
 Violin Concerto No. 1, Op. 35 (1916)
 Violin Concerto No. 2, Op. 61 (1932–1933)
Toru Takemitsu
Far calls. Coming, far! for Violin and Orchestra (1980)
Boris Tchaikovsky
Concerto for Violin and Orchestra (1969)
Pyotr Ilyich Tchaikovsky
Violin Concerto in D major, Op. 35 (1878)
Daniel Theaker
Violin Concerto
Henri Vieuxtemps
Violin Concerto No. 1 in E major, Op. 10 (1840)
Violin Concerto No. 2 in F minor, Op. 19 (ca. 1835–36)
Violin Concerto No. 3 in A major, Op. 25 (1844)
Violin Concerto No. 4 in D minor, Op. 31 (ca. 1850)
Violin Concerto No. 5 in A minor, Op. 37, Grétry (1861)
Violin Concerto No. 6 in G major, Op. 47/Op. posth. 1 (1865–1870)
Violin Concerto No. 7 in A minor, Op. 49/Op. posth. 3
Antonio Vivaldi — many, particularly:
L'estro Armonico, Op. 3 (1711)—twelve concertos
La stravaganza, Op. 4 (ca. 1714)
The Four Seasons (ca. 1725)—four concertos, the first four numbers of Il cimento dell'armonia e dell'inventione, Op. 8
Giovanni Battista Viotti
Violin Concerto No. 22 in A Minor
William Walton
Violin Concerto (1939)
Henryk Wieniawski
Violin Concerto No. 1 in F minor, Op. 14 (1853)
Violin Concerto No. 2 in D minor, Op. 22 (1862)
John Williams
Concerto for Violin and Orchestra (1976)
TreeSong: for Violin and Orchestra (2000)
Malcolm Williamson
Violin Concerto (1963–1964)
 Felix Woyrsch
 Skaldische Rhapsodie in D minor, Op. 50 (1904)
 Pēteris Vasks
 Tālā Gaisma ("Distant Light") (1996-7)
 He Zhanhao and Chen Gang
 Butterfly Lovers' Violin Concerto (1959)

List of other works for violin and orchestra

Béla Bartók
Violin Rhapsody No. 1 (1929)
Violin Rhapsody No. 2 (1928)
Ludwig van Beethoven
Romance No. 1 in G major, op. 40 (1798–1802)
Romance No. 2 in F major, op. 50 (1798–1802)
Hector Berlioz
Rêverie et Caprice, Op. 8 (1841; 1842)
Leonard Bernstein
Serenade, after Plato: Symposium (1954)
Ernest Bloch
Baal Shem (1939)
Max Bruch
Romance in A minor, op. 42 (1874)
Scottish Fantasy, op. 46 (1880)
Adagio Appassionato in C minor, op. 57 (1890)
In memoriam, op. 65 (1893)
Serenade in A minor, op. 75 (1899–1900)
Konzertstück in F minor, op. 84 (ca. 1911)
Ernest Chausson
Poème, op. 25 (1896)
John Corigliano
Chaconne from The Red Violin
Antonín Dvořák
Romance in F minor, op. 11 (1877)
Richard Franck
Serenade in A major, op. 25 (1896)
Takekuni Hirayoshi
Requiem for violin and orchestra
Joe Hisaishi
Interior Symphony for Electric Violin and Chamber Orchestra (2015)
Jules Massenet
"Méditation" from Thaïs (1894)
Wolfgang Amadeus Mozart
Concertone in C major, for two violins and orchestra, K. 190 (1774)
Rondo in B major, K. 269/261a (1775-1777)
Adagio in E major, K. 261 (1776)
Rondo in C major, K. 373 (1781)
Arvo Pärt
Fratres for violin, string orchestra and percussion (1992) 
Darf ich... for violin, bells and string orchestra (1995/1999)
Maurice Ravel
Tzigane (1924)
Laurence Rosenthal
Prophetic Voices for violin, percussion and orchestra
Camille Saint-Saëns
Introduction and Rondo Capriccioso in A minor, op. 28 (1863)
Romance in C major, op. 48 (1874)
Morceau de concert in G major, op. 62 (1880)
Havanaise in E major, op. 83 (1887)
Caprice andalous in G major, op. 122 (1904)
Pablo de Sarasate
Zigeunerweisen, op. 20 (1878)
Carmen Fantasy, op. 25 (1883)
Miramar-Zortzico, op. 42 (1899)
Introduction and Tarantella, op. 43 (1899)
Akira Senju
Sai Fog for violin and string orchestra (1994)
Four Seasons for violin and string orchestra (2004)
Franz Schubert
Konzertstück in D major, D. 345 (1816)
Rondo in A major, D. 438 (1816)
Polonaise in B major, D. 580 (1817)
Robert Schumann
Fantasy in C major, Op. 131 (1853)
Josef Suk
Fantasy in G minor, Op. 24
Toru Takemitsu
Nostalghia—In Memory of Andrei Tarkovsky for violin and string orchestra (1987)
Pyotr Ilyich Tchaikovsky
Sérénade mélancolique, Op. 26 (1875)
Souvenir d'un lieu cher, Op. 42 (written for violin and piano in 1878; arranged for violin and orchestra by Alexander Glazunov in 1896)
Valse-Scherzo, Op. 34 (1877)
Andrew Thomas
Premonitions (2017, written for violinist Claudia Schaer and North/South Ensemble)
John Williams
Markings for solo violin, strings and harp (2017)
Ralph Vaughan Williams
The Lark Ascending (1914)
Henryk Wieniawski
 Polonaise de Concert No. 1, Op. 4 (sometimes known as Polonaise Brillante; 1853)
Légende in G minor, op. 17 (1859)
 Fantasy brillante on Gounod's "Faust", op.20

See also 
Violin sonata
Piano trio

Notes 

Violins